HMS Unbeaten was a U-class submarine, of the second group of that class, built by Vickers Armstrong, Barrow-in-Furness. She was laid down on 22 November 1939 and was commissioned on 10 November 1940. So far she has been the only ship of the Royal Navy to bear the name Unbeaten.

Career
She also claimed to have sunk two sailing vessels with gunfire on 15 July 1941 at Marsa Zuag roads, Libya, but Italian sources only confirm damage to one fishing vessel.

Unbeaten also lightly damaged the Italian merchant Vettor Pisani on 16 March 1942. She also unsuccessfully attacked the Italian merchant Silvio Scaroni, the Italian troop transport Esperia and a large Italian troop transport, thought to be either Oceania or Neptunia.

Sinking

After a refit in Chatham, and subsequent workup, Unbeaten was attached to the Third Submarine Flotilla in Scotland.  Having sailed from Holy Loch on her last patrol, Unbeaten completed Operation Bluestone, landing an agent in Spain near Bayona. She then completed her patrol in the Bay of Biscay and was returning to the United Kingdom when she went missing.  It is believed that she was probably attacked and sunk in error by a Royal Air Force Wellington of No. 172 Squadron, Coastal Command in the Bay of Biscay on 11 November 1942.  She was lost with all hands.

Commanding officers

Her first CO was Edward "Teddy" Woodward. Her second and last CO was Lt Donald Ogilvy Watson.

References

Citations

Sources
 
 
 

 

British U-class submarines
Ships built in Barrow-in-Furness
1940 ships
World War II submarines of the United Kingdom
Friendly fire incidents of World War II
Maritime incidents in November 1942
Ships sunk by British aircraft
Submarines sunk by aircraft